Ashot Adamyan (14 February 1953 in Yerevan) is an Armenian film and stage actor.

Early career
Talented actor, director, and musician, Ashot Adamyan, is known not only in Armenia, but also in many other countries. He has had a major impact on the art of cinema and theater, bringing a new specific artistic style to his field. He is a winner of many prestigious international film festivals, has been a member of the judging panels of said prestigious film festivals several times, and is recognized as one of the most beloved Armenian actors. Ashot Adamyan was born in 1953 in Yerevan, Armenian SSR, USSR, which is now Armenia, to Karlos Adamyan (geologist) and Olga Harutyunyan (chemist). From a very early age he displayed exceptional artistic talent and embarked on his legendary career, playing in the school theater.

College years
After graduating from the Alexander Pushkin school in Yerevan, he attended the Yerevan Construction and Architectural College from 1968 to 1972. He graduated with honors from the college's architectural department, presenting his thesis on theater building design, which amazed the academic jury and was published by several newspapers. In his youth, he also played in many of the famous Armenian rock bands of that time, including Spiders, Apostles, and 1+2, and was known as a recognized rock singer and guitar player. From 1975 to 1979, Adamyan studied directing at State Pedagogical Institute under the wing of Henrik Malyan, one of the greatest Armenian film directors of all time. Later he attended Moscow High Courses for Scriptwriters and Film Directors with Rolan Bykov as his professor (1987-1990). During his years as a student, Ashot Adamyan managed to juggle both his studies and his blossoming career.

Cinema
His cinematic debut was in Vilen Zakaryan's "Bow to the Coming Day" (1977). Following this, director Arman Manaryan invited Ashot Adamyan to play the main character, Hovik, in his feature film, "Another five days" (1978). His next significant, leading role was as Captain Danielyan in "Silent Witness" (1980) by Anatoliy Mokatzian. However, his breakthrough performance was his role as Torik in the film "A Piece of the Sky" (Ktor me yerkinq (1980)) otherwise known as "A Slap" by translated versions, by Henrik Malyan. "A Piece of the Sky" (Ktor me yerkinq (1980)) was, and still is, considered one of the top classic Armenian movies of all time with a stellar cast, director, and ahead of its time screenwriting, and because of its fame, Ashot Adamyan became a household name. For this role, he received "The Most Charming Actor" award in the All-Union Film Festival in Vilnius in 1981.

Actor and director
Seeing Adamyan's exceptional talent, director Henrik Malyan founded The Actor's Theater adjacent to the "ArmenFilm" Studio in 1980, where Ashot Adamyan worked as an actor, director, and later, artistic director of the renamed Henrik Malyan Theater. He took to the stage "Nazar the Brave" by Derenik Demirchyan, "Orchestra" by Jean Anouilh, and "Divine Comedy" by Isidor Stock, and also played in "The Decameron" by Giovanni Boccaccio, "My name is Aram" by William Saroyan, "Autobiography" by Branislav Nusic, and "The Prisoner of Second Avenue" by Neil Simon etc. Along with his theater performances, Ashot Adamyan was continuing his acting career on the big screen. He starred in "Little Love Story" (1981), "A Drop of Honey" (A Drop of Honey (1982), and "The Song of the Old Days" (The Song of the Old Days (1982)) by Albert Mkrtchyan, where Ashot Adamyan portrayed the main character, Oberon, for which he received three diplomas from The Lenin Komsomol Central Committee, The Union of Cinematographers of ASSR, and The Ministry of Culture of ASSR. Since 1982, he became a member of The Union of Cinematographers of Armenia. Later, Adamyan starred in more movies, including "Master" (1983), "The Price of Return" (Tsena vozvrata (1983)), "We Shall Meet Again" (1984), "Path to the Sky" (1984), "Where are You Going, Soldier?" (Ur es gnum, zinvor? (1986)), and "The Deadline: Seven Days" (Zhamkete yot or (1991)).

New film
In 1992, a renowned Canadian filmmaker, Atom Egoyan, visited Armenia and started shooting his new film, Calendar (1993), starring Ashot Adamyan and Arsinée Khanjian. The film was presented in several international festivals and got great feedback from critics and audiences alike. In 1996, Ashot Adamyan, his wife, Armine Geghamyan, and their two children, Gohar and Mariam Adamyan, released his musical album, "Dle M'konde", which consisted of old Armenian folk songs with new developments and arrangements by Ashot Adamyan himself. The album was well accepted with Armenian, European and American-Armenian audiences. The live version of this project was later presented in Vienna, Austria in the "Troubadour" festival in 2002, within the "Armenian Folk Music: Before and After Sayat Nova" program. During this festival, Ashot performed "Tamam ashkharh ptut eka" by Sayat-Nova, cooperating with a famous jazz musician, Christoph Cech. In 2001, Adamyan was awarded by The Best Song Pan-Armenian Award for the song "Back to Yerevan" in the Sayat Nova 2001 festival.

Director and actor
In 1998, Ashot Adamyan was invited to Los Angeles to perform in Khoren Aramouni's play "Uncle Poghos's visit." Here, Ashot appeared both as a director and an actor. In 2003, director Adamyan was awarded "The best cognitive, cultural, and educational project" award for his film series "Javakhk: We are living here". The award was given by the "Television and Radio Association of Development" NGO. Later in 2005, Adamyan portrayed the main role of Tigran in Ruben Kochar's film, "The Path" (The Path (2005)). This film was shot in Armenia and the US in cooperation with the National Cinema Center of Armenia and Blue Lion Entertainment. In the same year, Adamyan put on the play by Bernard Slade, "Same Time, Next Year" in the Hakob Paronyan Musical Comedy Theater stage. The following year, Adamyan starred in Khachik Chalikyan's film, "Black and White Rainbow", and in 2007, portrayed the main character, Yusuf, in "The Enemies" by David Matevossyan in collaboration with "Focal" Swiss company.

Film festival
In 2008, Ashot Adamyan was an honorable jury member of the Golden Apricot Yerevan International Film Festival. On top of this, Adamyan organized artistic master classes in Tehran and directed "Like it or not - We are Armenians": a play dedicated to the 100th anniversary of William Saroyan. In 2009, Ashot Adamyan starred in "Metsamor", a mono-play based on the essay of a great writer, Hrant Matevosyan, for which Adamyan received The Best Actor "Artavazd" award by the Theater Workers Union of Armenia. After the turn of the decade, Ashot Adamyan, in cooperation with David Matevossyan, directed the film "We are...", dedicated to the 40th anniversary of the famous movie, "We and Our Mountains" (We and Our Mountains (1969)). The next year, by the invitation of Radio Liberty, Adamyan starred in "The Writer and the Reality" by the Radio Liberty Armenian Service production where he portrayed the infamous Armenian writer, Hovhannes Tumanyan. In 2012, he appeared in "The Pheasant Hunter", a segment of Half Moon Bay (2014) by Parallels Film production LLC supported by National Cinema Center of Armenia. In the same year, Adamyan presented his documentary film, "Snapshots", ordered by the women's NGO, "Shahkhatun," in Armenia. Following this project, he reunited with Canadian filmmaker, Atom Egoyan to create, "The Invisible World" (Mundo Invisível (2012)), their second collaboration. This film was brought to life by 12 directors (Theodoros Angelopoulos, Guy Maddin, Marco Bechis, Manoel de Oliveira, Laís Bodanzky, Gian Vittorio Baldi, Maria de Medeiros, Beto Brant, Cisco Vasques, Jerzy Stuhr, Wim Wenders, Atom Egoyan) and is presented through 11 short segments combined to become "The Invisible World" (Mundo Invisível (2012)). The Yerevan part of the film was directed by Atom Egoyan with the addition of Ashot Adamyan as the leading actor.

Poetry festival
In 2012 Ashot Adamyan participated in the Genoa Poetry Festival, introducing several songs from his "Dle M'konde" music album, which were warmly welcomed by the Italian audience. In 2013 Adamyan appeared in "A Hermit with no Tail" by Khachik Chalikyan, for which Adamyan received the "Hayak" National Film Award by the National Cinema Center of Armenia as the "Best Supporting Actor." In 2014, he was the leading actor in the film, "The Illuminator", by Atom Egoyan. In the same year, Ashot Adamyan was the head of the international jury of the One Square Meter Theatrical Festival in the Armenian Center for Contemporary Experimental Art (ACCEA). In 2015, Ashot Adamyan received Salento Cinema Actor Award from Salento International Film Festival in recognition of his work, achievements, and input in Armenian and International Cinematography. Recently, Ashot Adamyan starred in the feature films, Mariam's Day Off (2016) by Arshak Amirbekyan, And on the Seventh Day... (2015) by Arman Chilingaryan, and 28:94 Local Time (2015) aka Hot Country, Cold Winter (2016) by David Safarian.

Filmography 
 1977 - "Bow to the Coming Day"
 1978 - "Another Five Days": main role of Hovik. Film by Arman Manaryan.
 1980 - "Silent Witness": main role of Danielyan. Film by Anatoliy Mokatzyan.
 1980 - "A Piece of Sky" or "A Slap": main role of Torik. Film by Henrik Malyan.
 1981 - "Short Love Story": short film by Vanzetti Danielyan.
 1982 - "A Drop of Honey": participated as an actor and assistant director.
 1982 - "Song of the Old Days": main role of Oberon. Film by Albert Mkrtchyan.
 1983 - "The Master": Film by Bagrat Hovhannisyan.
 1983 - "The Price of Return": main role of Hayk. Film by Grigor Melik-Avagyan.
 1984 - "We Shall Meet Again": main role of Nathanael. 
 1984 - "A Path into the Sky": short film.
 1985 - "Where are You Going, Soldier?": main role of Hunan.
 1989 - "The Soviet Land": short film by Ashot Adamyan.
 1990 - "On Behalf of Nation": short film by Ashot Adamyan.
 1990 - "And if?": short film by Ashot Adamyan.
 1991 - "The Deadline - Seven Days": main role of the man. 
 1992 - Calendar: main role of the driver. Film by Atom Egoyan (Canada-Armenia).
 2002 - "On the Threshold"
 2005 - "The Path": main role of Tigran and Ashot. Directed by Ruben Kochar (USA-Armenia).
 2006 - "Black and White Rainbow": main role of Poliuto. Film by Khachik Chalikyan.
 2007 - "The Enemies": main role of Yusuf. Film by Davit Matevossian. 
 2010 - "We are…" (documentary): film by Ashot Adamyan and Davit Matevossian.
 2011 - "The Writer and the Reality": main role of Hovhannes Tumanyan. Film by Radio Liberty.
 2012 - "Snapshots" (documentary): film by Ashot Adamyan.
 2012 - "The Pheasant Hunter": main role. Film by Parallels Film production LLC.
 2012 - "The Invisible World": main role. Armenian segment by Atom Egoyan. 
 2013 - "A Hermit with no Tail" 
 2014 - "The Illuminator": main role. Film by Atom Egoyan.
 2015 - "And on the Seventh Day": main role. Film by Arman Chilingaryan.
 2015 - "28:94 Local Time" or "Hot Land, Cold Winter": main role. Film by David Safaryan (Armenia, Netherlands, Germany).
 2016 - "Mariam's Day Off" by Arshak Amirbekyan.

References

External links
 Ashot Adamyan Official Website
 Film Critic Susanna Harutyunyan's Reference
 

Armenian male film actors
Armenian male stage actors
1953 births
Living people
20th-century Armenian male actors
Male actors from Yerevan